The 1989 Winnipeg Blue Bombers finished in 3rd place in the East Division with a 7–11 record.

Offseason

CFL Draft

Preseason

Regular season

Standings

Season schedule

Playoffs

East Semi-Final

East Final

Awards and records

1989 CFL All-Stars

Eastern All-Star Selections

References

Winnipeg Blue Bombers seasons
1989 Canadian Football League season by team